Eustrongylides is a genus of nematodes belonging to the family Dioctophymatidae. The species of this genus cause eustrongylidosis.

The genus has almost cosmopolitan distribution.

Species:

Eustrongylides excisus 
Eustrongylides ignotus 
Eustrongylides mergorum 
Eustrongylides papillosus 
Eustrongylides rubrum 
Eustrongylides sinicus 
Eustrongylides spinispiculum 
Eustrongylides tubifex

References

Nematodes
Parasitic nematodes of tetrapods
Parasites of birds